Lupac (Romanian: Lupac; Croatian: Lupak) is a commune in Caraș-Severin County, Banat, Romania. In 2002, its population numbered 3,023 people and was mostly made up of Krashovani Croats. It is composed of four villages: Clocotici (Klokotič; Krassócsörgő), Lupac, Rafnic (Ravnik; Kengyeltó) and Vodnic (Vodnik; Vizes).

Demographics

Ethnic groups (2002 census):
 Croat (Krashovani) (93.38%)
 Romanians (5.32%)
 Others.

Languages
The commune is officially bilingual, with both Romanian and Croatian being used as working languages on public signage and in administration, education and justice (see Croats of Romania).

Religion

Most of the inhabitants of the commune (95.33%) are Roman Catholics.

References

External links
Census data

Communes in Caraș-Severin County
Localities in Romanian Banat